Eulepidotis juliata is a moth of the family Erebidae first described by Caspar Stoll in 1790. It is found in the Neotropics, including Peru, Ecuador and the Brazilian locality of Tefé.

References

Moths described in 1790
juliata